Pace or paces may refer to:

Business
Pace (transit), a bus operator in the suburbs of Chicago, US
Pace Airlines, an American charter airline
Pace Foods, a maker of a popular brand of salsa sold in North America, owned by Campbell Soup Company
Pace Membership Warehouse, a defunct American retail chain
Pace plc, a British electronics company
Pace Savings & Credit Union, a Canadian credit union
Pace Shopping Mall, a series of shopping mall complexes in Pakistan

Education in the United States
Pace University, New York
Pace University High School, New York
Pace Academy, a private secondary school in Atlanta, Georgia
Monsignor Edward Pace High School, a Catholic high school in Miami Gardens, Florida

People
Pace (surname), shared by various people
Paces (musician) from Australia

Places
Pace, Florida, a census-designated place, United States
Pace, Mississippi, a town, United States
Paces, Virginia, an unincorporated community, United States
Pace, Podlaskie Voivodeship, Poland
Pace Settlement, Nova Scotia, Canada

Sports
The speed and power imparted on a ball in sports such as:
Pace (pickleball)
Pace (tennis)
Pace (running), a runner's speed measured in time over distance
Pace car in auto racing

Units of measure
 Pace (unit), roughly equal to 
 Byzantine pace (bḗma) and double pace, equal to 2.5 and 5 Greek feet
 Roman pace, equal to 5 Roman feet
 Welsh pace, equal to 3 Welsh feet

Other uses
Pace (horse gait), a specific gait with two beats, where each lateral pair of legs moves forward at the same time
pace (Latin) ("with peace"), an editor's mark or scholarly notation used to indicate disagreement with a source
Pace (narrative), the speed at which a story is told
Parliamentary Assembly of the Council of Europe, the parliamentary arm of the Council of Europe
Peace flag, often emblazoned with the Italian word

See also
 
 PACE (disambiguation)
 Pacé (disambiguation)
 Pacer (disambiguation)
 Pacemaker (disambiguation)
 Pacing (disambiguation)
 Rhythm (disambiguation)
 Tempo (disambiguation)

ru:Темп